Rendani Airport  is an airport in Manokwari, West Papua, Indonesia. It is one of the largest and busiest airports in West Papua. The airport has a one runway designated 17/35 with an asphalt surface measuring 2000 by 45 meters (6562 ft x148 ft), a new terminal, cargo building and larger apron were finished in 2013.

Airlines and destinations

Ground handling
 Lintas Bintang Timur
 Cahaya Alam Abadi
 Koperasi Angkasa Manokwari

Accidents and incidents

On 13 April 2010, Merpati Nusantara Airlines Flight 836, operated by Boeing 737-300 PK-MDE, overran the runway on landing. All 103 passengers and six crew escaped alive.

Gallery

External links
 Rendani Airport - Indonesia Airport global website

References

Airports in West Papua (province)
Manokwari